Leechman is a surname. Notable people with the surname include:

James Leechman, Lord Leechman (1906–1986), Scottish advocate and judge
William Leechman (1706–1785), Scottish minister, theologian, and academic